Sue S. Conley (born February 19, 1960) is an American nonprofit administrator and Democratic politician. She is a member of the Wisconsin State Assembly and president of the city council of Janesville, Wisconsin.

Early life and career 
Conley was born in Galesburg, Illinois, and moved to Janesville, Wisconsin, with her parents in 1971.

Conley became involved in nonprofit management in the Janesville community and was executive director of the Rock County YWCA, and later, from 2002 through 2014, with the Community Foundation of Southern Wisconsin.  She retired in 2014, but continued to volunteer and offer her advice within the community, and served as interim executive director for several organizations over the next six years, including HealthNet of Rock County, KANDU Industries, and the UW–Rock County Foundation.

Political career 
Conley was elected to the Janesville city council in April 2017, and was reelected in 2019.  At the start of the 2020–2021 session, Conley was elected President of the City Council.

In February 2020, Janesville's state representative, Debra Kolste, announced she would not seek a fifth term in the Wisconsin State Assembly in the 2020 election.  Conley and Kolste were friends, and Conley had already been contemplating a run for higher office. With Kolste's endorsement, Conley entered the 2020 campaign.  Conley was able to avoid a primary contest and secured the Democratic nomination unopposed. In the general election, she faced Republican former city councilmember DuWayne Severson; Libertarian hopeful Reese Wood had intended to run, but failed to secure enough valid signatures to appear on the ballot.  During the campaign, Conley emphasized the need for redistricting reform, endorsing the so-called Iowa model of redistricting, utilizing a nonpartisan commission.  In the general election, Conley defeated Severson with 60% of the vote.

Personal life 
Conley and her husband, Jim, reside in Janesville, Wisconsin. They have three children, Scott, Bernie, and Liz.

Electoral history

Janesville City Council (2017, 2019)

| colspan="6" style="text-align:center;background-color: #e9e9e9;"| General Election, April 4, 2017 (choose four)

| colspan="6" style="text-align:center;background-color: #e9e9e9;"| General Election, April 2, 2019 (choose four)

Wisconsin Assembly (2020)

| colspan="6" style="text-align:center;background-color: #e9e9e9;"| General Election, November 3, 2020

References

External links
 
 
 Campaign website
 44th Assembly District (2011–2021)
 Sue Conley on LinkedIn
 YWCA Rock County
 HealthNet of Rock County
 KANDU Industries, Inc.

Living people
Date of birth uncertain
Politicians from Janesville, Wisconsin
People from Galesburg, Illinois
Women state legislators in Wisconsin
Wisconsin city council members
21st-century American politicians
21st-century American women politicians
Year of birth uncertain
1960 births
Democratic Party members of the Wisconsin State Assembly